Natascha Heintz (born 25 February 1930) is a Norwegian paleontologist. She was born in New York City, and grew up in Bærum, a daughter of Anatol Heintz and Mary Solnørdal. Her scientific research specialized on fossile fish. She worked for the Paleontologisk Museum in Oslo from 1967 to 2000. She has been editor of the journal Norsk Geologisk Tidsskrift, was a member of several governmental committees, and is an honorary member of Norges Museumsforbund.

References

1930 births
Living people
People from Bærum
Norwegian paleontologists
Academic journal editors